Andrea Riley (born July 22, 1988) is an American professional basketball player, most recently with the Los Angeles Sparks of the Women's National Basketball Association (WNBA). She was drafted 8th overall in the 2010 WNBA Draft by the Sparks.

Riley played collegiately for the Oklahoma State Cowgirls. As a senior in 2009–10, she was selected as the Nancy Lieberman Award winner, which is given annually the nation's best NCAA female point guard. She also ended that season as the nation's second leading scorer at 26.7 points per game.

Oklahoma State statistics

Source

See also 
 List of NCAA Division I women's basketball season scoring leaders

References 

1988 births
Living people
All-American college women's basketball players
American women's basketball players
Basketball players from Dallas
Los Angeles Sparks draft picks
Los Angeles Sparks players
Oklahoma State Cowgirls basketball players
Phoenix Mercury players
Point guards
Tulsa Shock players